Train Above the City is the ninth and penultimate album by English alternative rock band Felt, released in 1988.

The album does not feature frontman Lawrence in any musical capacity, apart from directing the sessions and providing the track titles (except for "Run Chico Run", which is credited to Wenzel Brown). The music, all instrumental and in a jazz style, was written and performed by keyboardist Martin Duffy and drummer/percussionist Gary Ainge.

Reviewing the album for Melody Maker, Simon Turner said it "bears no obvious relationship to anything else they've done."

Track listing
All songs written by Martin Duffy and Gary Ainge.

Personnel
Martin Duffy – vibes and vibes piano
Gary Ainge – vibes and drums

References 

Felt (band) albums
1988 albums
Creation Records albums